Sefid Ab (also Romanized as Sefīd Āb) is a village in Dowreh Rural District, Chegeni District, Dowreh County, Lorestan Province, Iran. At the 2006 census, its population was 79, in 16 families.

References 

Towns and villages in Dowreh County